East Gwillimbury GO Station is a train and bus station in the GO Transit network located in East Gwillimbury, Ontario, Canada. It is a stop on the Barrie line train service. The station was opened on November 1, 2004.

Services
East Gwillimbury station has weekday train service consisting of 10 trains southbound to Union Station in the morning, 1 train northbound to Bradford in the early afternoon, 7 trains northbound to Barrie in the afternoon and 2 trains northbound to Bradford in the evening and night.  At other times, GO bus route 68 operates hourly between Barrie Bus Terminal and Aurora GO Station, where passengers can connect to the all-day train service to Toronto.

Weekend train service consists of 3 trains southbound to Union station in the morning and 3 trains returning northbound in the afternoon and evening.  At other times, the station is served by GO bus route 68 which operates hourly between Barrie Bus Terminal and Aurora GO station, where passengers can transfer to the all-day weekend train service toward Toronto.

Connecting transit

The station has a bus terminal located on the north side where GO Bus service supplements trains during the time when no trains are scheduled. York Region Transit (YRT) routes extend here from their regular termini during rush hours to connect with GO Trains.

Platform assignments
Platform 1: GO Transit extra
Platform 2: GO Transit extra
Platform 4: GO 68B, 68 northbound to Barrie Bus Terminal
Platform 8: GO 66, 66A Southbound to Yorkdale Bus Terminal 
Platform 9: GO 65B southbound to Union Station Bus Terminal via Newmarket GO Station
Platform 9: GO 65 southbound to Union Station Bus Terminal via Aurora GO Station
Platform 9: GO 68 southbound to Aurora GO Station
Platform 11: Unassigned
Platform 12: YRT Mobility On-Request
Platform 14: Unassigned
Platform 15: YRT 54 Bayview

References

External links

GO Transit railway stations
Railway stations in the Regional Municipality of York
Railway stations in Canada opened in 2004
East Gwillimbury
2004 establishments in Ontario